Red Ant Enterprises was an Australia-based producer and distributor of video games for multiple platforms, as well as videos and software.  The company went into receivership in January, 2009.

List of Video Games distributed by Red Ant Enterprises by Publisher

1C

PC 
 Ascension to the Throne
 UFO Trilogy
 Deus Ex Game of the Year Edition

505 Games

PC 
 ArmA: Armed Assault
 ArmA: Queens Gambit

Nintendo DS 
 Big Catch: Bass Fishing
 Brain Buster
 Cookie & Cream
 Cooking Mama
 Cooking Mama 2
 Cooking Mama Wii
 Dave Mirra BMX Challenge
 Deep Labyrinth
 Draglade
 Fashion Designer: Style Icon
 Hoshigami
 Kameleon
 Kira Kira Pop Princess
 Labyrinth
 MinDStorm
 Monster Bomber
 Monster Puzzle
 My Pet Dolphin
 Mystery Detective
 New Touch Party Game
 Princess on Ice
 Spellbound
 Starz
 The Professor's Brain Trainer: Memory
 Professor's Brain Trainer: Logic
 Turn It Around
 World Championship Poker Deluxe Series

Xbox 360 
 A-Train HX
 Supreme Commander

Wii 
 Bust-A-Move Wii
 Guilty Gear XX Accent Core
 Radio Helicopter
 Table Football

PS3 
 Armoured Core 4

PSP 
 Aces of War
 Armored Core: Formula Front
 Exit 2
 Gurumin
 Riviera

PS2 
 Armored Core: Last Raven
 Brunswick Pro Bowling
 Forty 4 Party
 Harvest Moon: A Wonderful Life
 Michigan: Report from Hell
 Playwize Poker and Casino
 Raw Danger
 Samurai Western
 Stella Deus
 World Championship Poker: Featuring Howard Lederer "All In"

Ascaron

PC 
 Arena Wars
 Attack on Pearl Harbor
 Dark Star One
 Sacred
 Sacred Plus
 Tortuga Two Treasures

Bethesda

PC 
 Fallout 3
 Sea Dogs
 The Elder Scrolls III: Morrowind

Xbox 360 
 Fallout 3

Wii 
 AMF Bowling Pinbusters
 Star Trek: Conquest

Nintendo DS 
 Ducati Moto

PS3 
 Fallout 3

PS2 
 Star Trek: Conquest

Big Bytes

PC 
 1001 Puzzles - The Puzzle Collection
 Aussie Video Slots
 Babyz
 Big Mother Truckers 2: Truck Me Harder
 Brain Training: Deluxe Edition
 Brian Lara International Cricket 2005
 Capitalism II
 Carmageddon
 Cats 5
 Chessmaster 8000
 Conflict: Desert Storm
 Conquest
 Crazy Frog Racer
 Crazy Golf: World Tour
 Dark Star One: BB
 Dino Crisis 2
 Dogs 5
 Earth 2150
 Europa Universalis
 FlatOut
 Ford Racing 3
 Tom Clancy's Ghost Recon
 Ghostmaster
 Hearts of Iron
 Hello Kitty: Roller Rescue
 Heroes of the Pacific
 IGI 2: Covert Strike
 IL-2: Sturmovik
 International Cricket Captain Ashes Year 2005
 Jacked
 Junior Board Games
 Korea: Forgotten Conflict
 Magic Solitaire
 Mahjongg
 Marine Sharpshooter
 Micro Machines V4
 My Animal Hospital
 My Pony Stables BB
 Myst Masterpiece
 Patrician III
 Perfect Sudoku & Kakuro Classics
 Pet Tycoon
 Poker Masters
 Port Royale: Gold, Power and Pirates
 Port Royale 2
 Prisoner of War
 Ravenshield
 Rayman 2
 Resident Evil 3
 Rogue Spear Phantom
 Sacred Gold
 Sacred Plus
 SCAR : Squadra Corse Alfa Romeo
 Sensible Soccer 2006
 The Settlers IV
 Silent Hunter II
 Soldiers: Heroes of War 2
 Space Invaders Anniversary
 Starship Troopers
 Starsky and Hutch
 Sudden Strike: Gold Edition
 Taito Legends 2
 The Elder Scrolls III:Morrowind
 The Entente
 The Sudoku Challenge

PS2 
 Big Mother Truckers 2: Truck Me Harder
 Crazy Frog Racer
 Jacked
 Taito Legends 2

Nintendo DS 
 Crazy Frog Racer

Black Bean

PS2 
 Australian Idol Sing
 Diabolik: The Original Sin
 SBK: World Superbike Championship 2007
 The History Channel: Great Battles of Rome

Nintendo DS 
 Evolution GT
 History: Great Empires Rome
 Superbike Riding Challenge

External links 
 Red Ant Enterprises Pty Ltd., MobyGames

Red Ant Enterprises